Gastrotheca zeugocystis is a species of frogs in the family Hemiphractidae. It is endemic to Peru and only known from its type locality on the Cordillera de Carpish, Huánuco Region.  The specific name zeugocystis refers to the paired brood pouches in this species (from the Greek zeugos, meaning pair, and the Greek kystis, meaning sac).

Description
The holotype, an adult female, measured  in snout–vent length; an adult male measured  in snout–vent length. The tympanum is visible. The dorsum and head are brown and have small, irregular markings. The dorsal skin is smooth. The iris is reddish brown and has black reticulations. The brood pouches are paired and lateral (most Gastrotheca have a single, dorsal brood pouch).

Habitat and conservation
Specimens have been found under leaves and under a piece of wood.

Gastrotheca zeugocystis is only known from two individuals. It is threatened by deforestation caused by agricultural expansion and firewood extraction. It is not known from any protected area.

References

zeugocystis
Amphibians of the Andes
Amphibians of Peru
Endemic fauna of Peru
Frogs of South America
Amphibians described in 2004
Taxonomy articles created by Polbot